The 2017 League of Legends World Championship was an esports tournament for the multiplayer online battle arena video game League of Legends. It was the seventh iteration of the League of Legends World Championship, an annual international tournament organized by the game's developer, Riot Games. It was held from September 23November 4, 2017, in cities across China. Twenty four teams qualified for the tournament based on their placement in regional circuits such as those in North America, Europe, South Korea, and China, with twelve of those teams having to reach the group stage via a play-in round.

The finals featured a rematch of last year's competitors, and in 2017, Samsung Galaxy secured their second championship win after defeating the three-time world champion SK Telecom T1, with a 3–0 sweep in a best of five final series. Samsung has previously won the 2014 League of Legends World Championship. Park "Ruler" Jae-hyuk, the AD carry of Samsung, was named the MVP of the tournament for his outstanding performances.

Against the Current and Jay Chou collaborated with Riot Games to produce two exclusive songs titled "Legends Never Die" and "Heroes" respectively for the tournament, while Alan Walker also produced his own remix of "Legends Never Die".

The 2017 Worlds has been widely praised for its ceremonial performances, while receiving attention worldwide due to the high quality of the tournament, its multiple dramatic and emotional series, and SK Telecom T1's tributary moments. The finals gained a solid following of 60 million unique viewers, breaking 2016's viewer record. A donation of US$2.35 million was also raised through the sales of Worlds 2017 Championship Ashe skin, reaching out to different charities and receiving commendations.

Teams and qualifications 
Based on the results of MSI and the World Championship in the previous two years, all teams from South Korea (LCK) were seeded directly into the group stage and Taiwan/Hong Kong/Macau (LMS) received an extra seed. With the ranking of the 2017 Mid Season Invitational, Southeast Asia (GPL) received a group stage seed for the summer champion team and one more slot in the play-in stage for the summer runner-up team, and the North American (NA LCS) summer split champion team was seeded to Pool 2 due to not qualifying for the top 4 at the MSI.

Rosters

{| class="wikitable"
|-
!rowspan="2"|Teams
!colspan="5"|Players
!rowspan="2"|Coach
|-
!Top
!Jungle
!Mid
!ADC
!Support
|-
!colspan="7" style="text-align:left;"|China (LPL)
|-
| rowspan="2" | EDward Gaming
| Mouse(Chen Yuhao)

| rowspan="2" | Clearlove7
| rowspan="2" | Scout
| rowspan="2" | iBoy
| rowspan="2" | Meiko
| rowspan="2" | NoFe
|-
| Audi
|-
| Royal Never Give Up
| Letme
| Mlxg
 Y1HAN

| Xiaohu
| Uzi
| Ming
| FireFox
|-
| Team WE
| 957
| Condi
| xiye
| Mystic
| Ben
 Zero

| Homme
|-
!colspan="7" style="text-align:left;"|Europe (EU LCS)
|-
| rowspan="2" | G2 Esports
| rowspan="2" | Expect
| rowspan="2" | Trick
| rowspan="2" | Perkz
| rowspan="2" | Zven
| mithy

| rowspan="2" | YoungBuck
|-
| Hoang
|-
| rowspan="2" | Misfits Gaming
| rowspan="2" | Alphari
| rowspan="2" | Maxlore
| rowspan="2" | PowerOfEvil
| rowspan="2" | Hans Sama
| IgNar

| rowspan="2" | Daku
|-
| Hiiva
|-
| rowspan="2" | Fnatic
| rowspan="2" | sOAZ
| rowspan="2" | Broxah
| Caps

| rowspan="2" | Rekkles
| rowspan="2" | Jesiz
| rowspan="2" | Dylan Falco
|-
| Special
|-
!colspan="7" style="text-align:left;"|North America (NA LCS)
|-
| rowspan="2" | Team SoloMid
| rowspan="2" | Hauntzer
| rowspan="2" | Svenskeren
| rowspan="2" | Bjergsen
| Doublelift

| rowspan="2" | Biofrost
| rowspan="2" | Parth
|-
| MrRallez
|-
| rowspan="2" | Immortals
| rowspan="2" | Flame
| Xmithie

| rowspan="2" | Pobelter
| rowspan="2" | Cody Sun
| rowspan="2" | Olleh
| rowspan="2" | SSONG
|-
| AnDa
|-
| rowspan="2" | Cloud9
| Impact

| rowspan="2" | Contractz
| rowspan="2" | Jensen
| rowspan="2" | Sneaky
| rowspan="2" | Smoothie
| rowspan="2" | Reapered
|-
| Ray
|-
!colspan="7" style="text-align:left;"|South Korea (LCK)
|-
| rowspan="2" | Longzhu Gaming
| Khan

| rowspan="2" | Cuzz
| rowspan="2" | Bdd
| rowspan="2" | PraY
| rowspan="2" | GorillA
| rowspan="2" | Kim Jeong-soo
|-
| Rascal
|-
| rowspan="2" | SK Telecom T1
| rowspan="2" | Huni
| Peanut

| rowspan="2" | Faker
| rowspan="2" | Bang
| rowspan="2" | Wolf
| rowspan="2" | kkOma
|-
| Blank
|-
| rowspan="2" | Samsung Galaxy
| rowspan="2" | CuVee
| Ambition

| rowspan="2" | Crown
| rowspan="2" | Ruler
| rowspan="2" | CoreJJ
| rowspan="2" | Edgar
|-
| Haru
|-
!colspan="7" style="text-align:left;"|Taiwan – Hong Kong – Macau (LMS)
|-
| rowspan="2" | Flash Wolves
| MMD

| rowspan="2" | Karsa
| rowspan="2" | Maple
| rowspan="2" | Betty
| rowspan="2" | SwordArT
| rowspan="2" | Steak
|-
| Cyo
|-
| rowspan="2" | ahq e-Sports Club
| rowspan="2" | Ziv
| rowspan="2" | Mountain
| Westdoor

| rowspan="2" | AN
| rowspan="2" | Albis
| rowspan="2" | GreenTea
|-
| Chawy
|-
| rowspan="2" | Hong Kong Attitude
| rowspan="2" | Riris
| Godkwai

| rowspan="2" | M1ssion
| rowspan="2" | Unified
| rowspan="2" | Kaiwing
| rowspan="2" | Tabe
|-
| Gemini
|-
!colspan="7" style="text-align:left;"|Vietnam►Southeast Asia (VCS►GPL)
|-
| rowspan="2" | GIGABYTE Marines
| rowspan="2" | Archie
| rowspan="2" | Levi
| rowspan="2" | Optimus
| rowspan="2" | Noway
| Nevan

| rowspan="2" | Tinikun
|-
| Sya
|-
| rowspan="2" | Young Generation
| Ren

| rowspan="2" | Venus
| rowspan="2" | Naul
| rowspan="2" | BigKoro
| rowspan="2" | Palette
| rowspan="2" | Koo
|-
| NhocTy
|-
!colspan="7" style="text-align:left;"|Brazil (CBLOL)
|-
| rowspan="2" | Team oNe Esports
| rowspan="2" | VVvert
| rowspan="2" | 4LaN
| Brucer

| rowspan="2" | Absolut
| rowspan="2" | RedBert
| rowspan="2" | Neki
|-
| Marf
|-
!colspan="7" style="text-align:left;"|Commonwealth of Independent States (LCL)
|- Gambit Esports
| rowspan="2" | Gambit Esports
| rowspan="2" | PvPStejos
| rowspan="2" | Diamondprox
| rowspan="2" | Kira

| Blasting
| rowspan="2" | EDward
| rowspan="2" | Invi
|-
| Tauren
|-
!colspan="7" style="text-align:left;"|Turkey (TCL)
|-
| rowspan="2" | 1907 Fenerbahçe
| rowspan="2" | Thaldrin
| Crash

| rowspan="2" | Frozen
| rowspan="2" | padden
| rowspan="2" | Japone
| rowspan="2" | Pades
|-
| WaenA
|-
!colspan="7" style="text-align:left;"|Japan (LJL)
|-
| rowspan="2" | Rampage
| rowspan="2" | Evi
| Tussle

| rowspan="2" | Ramune
| rowspan="2" | YutoriMoyasi
| rowspan="2" | Dara
| rowspan="2" | 34
|-
| TETE
|-
!colspan="7" style="text-align:left;"|Latin America North (LLN)
|-
| rowspan="2" | Lyon Gaming
| rowspan="2" | Jirall
| rowspan="2" | Oddie
| rowspan="2" | Seiya
| WhiteLotus

| rowspan="2" | Genthix
| rowspan="2" | Yeti
|-
| MarioMe
|-
!colspan="7" style="text-align:left;"|Latin America South (CLS)
|-
| rowspan="2" | Kaos Latin Gamers
| rowspan="2" | MANTARRAYA
| rowspan="2" | Tierwulf
| rowspan="2" | Plugo
| Fix

| rowspan="2" | Slow
| rowspan="2" | Pierre
|-
| Focho
|-
!colspan="7" style="text-align:left;"|Oceania (OPL)
|-
| rowspan="2" | Dire Wolves
| rowspan="2" | Chippys
| shernfire

| rowspan="2" | Phantiks
| rowspan="2" | k1ng
| rowspan="2" | Destiny
| rowspan="2" | Sharp
|-
| Rippii
|}

Venues 
Wuhan, Guangzhou, Shanghai, Beijing were the four cities chosen to host the competition.

Play-in stage

Group A

Group B

Group C

Group D

Elimination

Group stage

Group A

Group B 

Due to the same record, (2W-4L) and the same head-to-head record vs each other, (1–1), FNC, GAM and IMT had to play in 2 matches of tie-breakers. GAM was received a bye to TB2 because of the shortest winning time. FNC and IMT played in TB1 match, and the winner (FNC) played against GAM in TB2 to decide the 2nd-place team.

Group C

Group D

Knockout stage

Bracket

Quarter-finals 
 The winner(s) will advance to the semi-finals.

Match 1 
 Date: 19 October

Match 2 
 Date: 20 October

Match 3 
 Date: 21 October

Match 4 
 Date: 22 October

Semi-finals 
 The winner(s) advanced to the Finals.

Match 1 

 Date: 28 October

Match 2 
 Date: 29 October

Finals 
 Date: 4 November
 The members of the winning team will lift the Summoner's Cup, earning their title as the League of Legends 2017 World Champions.

Final standings

League of Legends Live 
League of Legends Live was held on the eve of the finals, November 3, in Beijing National Aquatics Center (or known as the Water Cube) to commemorate the tournament, featuring international artists and League of Legends community musicians. It featured performances of a wide variety of music from League of Legends, including Get Jinxed, hits from Pentakill, DJ Sona, Warsongs, Star Guardian, The Curse Of The Sad Mummy, medleys of a wide variety of Worlds and Champion themes, DJ and music producer Alan Walker, and many other tracks over the course of the 90-minute show.

Reception of performances 
During the opening ceremony of the finals, dancers were decked out in different masks, unified as the ground around them exploded with visual effects and colors. It was followed by Jay Chou's Worlds 2017 remix Hero performance, and a live version of Legends Never Die by Against the Current, with Chou playing the piano behind. An augmented reality dragon (modeled after the in-game Elder Drake) also flew and soared around the arena halfway through the performance, with a giant Summoner's Cup rising from the grounds of the stadium at the same time, catching the stadium's audience and global fans by surprise. The closing ceremony featured Alan Walker performing his own remix of Legends Never Die, with Chrissy Costanza on the vocals. The overall performances of the ceremony received widespread praises.

Legacy 

The finals had 60 million unique viewers worldwide, breaking 2016's viewer record.

League of Legends fans raised over US$2 million for three different charities (BasicNeeds, Learning Equality and the Raspberry Pi Foundation) with the sales of the "Worlds 2017 Championship Ashe" skin.

The loss of SK Telecom T1 in a 0–3 defeat, as well as Faker's emotional moment is considered to be one of the greatest upsets in League of Legends' history, and noticeably caught the attention of League of Legends' fans throughout the world, with many tributes given to the team and Faker for their success.

References

External links 

League of Legends World Championship
2017 multiplayer online battle arena tournaments
Sports competitions in Beijing
Sports competitions in Shanghai
Sports competitions in Guangzhou
Sport in Wuhan